The 2017–18 GFA Premier Division is the 34th season of top-division football in Grenada. The season began on 24 June 2017.

Standings

Note: remaining two matches annulled as teams involved were unwilling to play

References

2017
Grenada
Grenada
football